The Chaudière River (French for "Cauldron" or "Boiler"; Abenaki: Kik8ntekw) is a  river with its source near the Town of Lac-Mégantic, in southeast Quebec, Canada. From its source Lake Mégantic in the Estrie region, it runs northwards to flow into the St. Lawrence River opposite Quebec City.

Geography

Its principal tributaries are:
Rivière du Loup (not to be confused with Rivière du Loup in the Bas-Saint-Laurent), also known as the Rivière Linière
Famine River
Beaurivage River
Bras Saint-Victor

The river's basin has nearly 50 percent of the faunal richness of Quebec, namely 330 out of 653 vertebrate species known in the province can be found there.

The river, and the  Chaudière Falls which it passes over, are popular outdoor recreation areas.

Municipalities crossed 

Its course crosses the regional county municipalities (MRC) of:

Left bank of the Chaudière river (from the confluence):
 Lévis ("Saint-Rédempteur" and "Saint-Étienne-de-Lauzon" sectors);
 MRC of La Nouvelle-Beauce in Chaudière-Appalaches: municipalities of Saint-Bernard, Saint-Lambert-de-Lauzon, Scott, Sainte-Marie-de-Beauce;
 MRC Beauce-Centre in Chaudière-Appalaches: municipalities of Saint-Joseph-des-Érables, Beauceville;
 MRC Beauce-Sartigan, in Chaudière-Appalaches: municipalities of Notre-Dame-des-Pins, Saint-Georges-de-Beauce, Saint-Martin, Saint-Gédéon;
 MRC Le Granit in Estrie: municipalities of Saint-Ludger, Sainte-Cécile-de-Whitton, Lac-Mégantic.

Right bank of the Chaudière river (from the confluence):
 Lévis ("Charny" and "Sainte-Hélène-de-Breakeyville" sectors);
 MRC of La Nouvelle-Beauce in Chaudière-Appalaches: municipalities of Sainte-Marie-de-Beauce, Vallée-Jonction,
 MRC Beauce-Centre in Chaudière-Appalaches: municipality of Beauceville,
 MRC of Beauce-Sartigan in Chaudière-Appalaches: municipalities of Saint-Joseph-de-Beauce, Saint-Simon-les-Mines, Saint-Georges-de-Beauce, Saint-Martin, Saint-Gédéon,
 MRC Le Granit in Estrie: municipalities of Saint-Robert-Bellarmin, Frontenac, Audet, Lac-Mégantic ("Fatima" sector)

History
The Abenaki Nation, whose homeland Ndakinna encompasses the river and Chaudière Falls, call it "Kik8ntekw" or "Kikonteku", meaning "River of the Fields." On the charts of Samuel de Champlain, it was given the name "Etchemin River" (a name now used for another river whose drainage area borders with that of the Chaudière River). It was called "Rivière du Sault de la Chaudière" for a period of time before it became simply "Rivière Chaudière" towards the end of the 18th century. This name refers to the waterfall close to its mouth.

Its location was strategic for French colonization during the 18th century, because the river was a natural link between New France and the British colonies to the south. It was also used by Benedict Arnold at the time of his 1775 expedition in the invasion of Quebec.

In 1823, gold was found along its shores in the Eastern Townships of Quebec.

On 6 July 2013 the Lac-Mégantic derailment caused a major oil spill which contaminated the river at its source at Lac Mégantic.  Downstream communities such as Saint-Georges ( to the northeast) were forced to obtain potable water from alternate sources and residents asked to limit their water consumption. Floating barriers were installed in an attempt to contain the contamination.

21st century

The Chaudière valley mostly crosses the Beauce area. The river impacts its industries and way of life, particularly during spring run-off, when it frequently overflows into populated areas, in spite of the 160 dams and levees. The river flows through several cities and villages of the area such as Sainte-Marie, Saint-Georges, Beauceville, and Saint-Joseph-de-Beauce.

The river is a popular location for outdoor sports, particularly at Lac-Mégantic and at Parc des Chutes-de-la-Chaudière. Located close to the mouth of the river at Lévis, this park offers cycling and hiking trails, as well as a footbridge suspended above the river which offers a view of the waterfalls.

The falls have been harnessed for hydro-electric power since the beginning of the 20th century. The dam was rebuilt in 1999 on the remains of the old installations, and now consists of a small 24 MW power station.

Description 
The Chaudière Valley largely crosses the Quebec region of Beauce. It has shaped its industries and its way of life, particularly in spring when its overflows during snowmelt in inhabited areas are frequent, despite its course regulated by 160 dams and retaining dikes. The river runs through several towns and villages in the region, including Saint-Ludger, Saint-Gédéon-de-Beauce, Saint-Martin, Saint-Georges-de-Beauce, Notre-Dame-des-Pins, Beauceville, Saint-Joseph-de-Beauce, Vallée-Jonction and Sainte-Marie, Quebec.

The river is a prime site for outdoor activities, particularly near lac Mégantic and Chutes-de-la-Chaudière park.

Gallery

List of bridges

See also
List of rivers of Quebec

References

External links

Le comité du bassin versant de la rivière Chaudière (in French)

Rivers of Estrie
Rivers of Chaudière-Appalaches